Sânmihaiu de Câmpie is a commune in Bistrița-Năsăud County, Transylvania, Romania. It is composed of six villages: Brăteni (Mezőbarátfalva), La Curte (Köbölkútitanyák), Sălcuța (Fűzkút), Sânmihaiu de Câmpie, Stupini (Mezősolymos) and Zoreni (Lompérd).

The commune is located in the southern part of the county, on the Transylvanian Plateau.

Sânmihaiu de Câmpie is traversed by county roads DJ151 and DJ162.

At the 2011 census, Sânmihaiu de Câmpie had a population of 1,459. According to the census, 85.74% of inhabitants are Romanians, 8.7% Roma, and 2.26% Hungarians.

Natives
Ioan Fiscuteanu (1937–2007), theater and film actor
 (1884–?), farmer and delegate at the Great National Assembly of Alba Iulia of December 1, 1918

References

Communes in Bistrița-Năsăud County
Localities in Transylvania